Jump the Gun may refer to:
 Jump the Gun (film), 1997
 Jump the Gun (band), an Irish pop/rock band, best known for competing in the Eurovision Song Contest 
 Jump the Gun (album), an album by Pretty Maids
 "Jump the Gun", a song by Gotthard from the album Bang!
 a false start, in athletics